Federico Leo (born August 27, 1988, in Varese) is an Italian racing driver.

Career

Formula Junior
Leo began his single–seater career in late 2005 in the Italian Formula Junior 1600 Winter series, scoring nine points to finish 13th in the standings. The following year he took part in a full season in the category, recording one podium finish to be classified in 12th place.

Formula Renault 2.0
At the end of the 2006 season, Leo took part in the Italian Formula Renault 2.0 Winter series for RP Motorsport, finishing in 15th place. In 2007, he continued with the team into the main championship, although he failed to score a point in the fourteen races he contested.

Formula Three
In 2008, Leo stepped up to the German Formula Three Championship with the Italian Ombra Racing team. He finished ninth in the standings after taking a single podium place in the opening round at Hockenheim. He also made a one–off appearance in the British Formula 3 Championship round at Monza in May. After starting both races from the back of the grid, he finished 14th in race one before retiring from the second race.

Formula Renault 3.5 Series

At the end of 2008, Leo took part in Formula Renault 3.5 Series collective testing at Paul Ricard and Valencia. After testing for both RC Motorsport and Pons Racing, Leo signed with the latter to contest the 2009 season, alongside Spaniard Marcos Martínez. He scored eight points over the course of the 17–race season, with those points coming at the final round of the campaign at the new Motorland Aragón circuit with a pair of seventh-place finishes.

During the off–season Leo tested with several different teams, including Fortec Motorsport and Draco Racing, but remained with Pons Racing for a second season in 2010. After scoring a fifth place in the opening round at Motorland Aragón, Leo took just three more points finishes and was classified in 17th place, tied on 16 points with both Walter Grubmüller and Jan Charouz.

Auto GP
In May 2010, Leo made his debut in the new Auto GP championship at Imola, replacing Adrian Zaugg at the Trident Racing team. After finishing in ninth place in the feature race, Leo took fifth place in the sprint event after surviving a startline accident that eliminated six cars. In October 2010, Leo rejoined the team for the final round of the season at Monza, finishing the two races in fifth and seventh places respectively to be classified 16th in the final standings.

Sportscars
In April 2010, Leo tested a Lola B08/80 LMP2 car at Vallelunga for the Italian Racing Box team, and in August 2010 it was announced that he would join the team for the Le Mans Series round at the Hungaroring, the penultimate round of the season. He stayed with the team for the final round of the year at Silverstone, where he and teammates Fabio Babini and Ferdinando Geri finished 13th overall and 5th in the LMP2 class. He was classified 17th in the final LMP2 standings.

For 2011, Leo raced in the FIA GT3 European Championship with AF Corse, sharing a Ferrari 458 with fellow Italian driver Francesco Castellacci. The duo won the drivers' title at the final round of the season in Zandvoort, finishing nine points clear of the Graff Racing entry of Mike Parisy.

GP2 Series
Leo made his GP2 Series début at the final round of the 2010 season in Abu Dhabi, replacing Edoardo Piscopo at the Trident Racing team. He finished the feature race in 19th place, but retired from the sprint event.

Racing record

Career summary

† – As Leo was a guest driver, he was ineligible for championship points.

Complete Formula Renault 3.5 Series results
(key) (Races in bold indicate pole position) (Races in italics indicate fastest lap)

24 Hours of Le Mans results

References

External links

 
 

1988 births
Living people
Sportspeople from Varese
Italian racing drivers
European Le Mans Series drivers
24 Hours of Le Mans drivers
Auto GP drivers
German Formula Three Championship drivers
British Formula Three Championship drivers
Italian Formula Renault 2.0 drivers
World Series Formula V8 3.5 drivers
GP2 Series drivers
International GT Open drivers
FIA World Endurance Championship drivers
Italian Formula Renault 1.6 drivers
Pons Racing drivers
AF Corse drivers
Trident Racing drivers
RP Motorsport drivers
Team Lazarus drivers
Ombra Racing drivers
Euronova Racing drivers